The 1971 Virginia Cavaliers football team represented the University of Virginia during the 1971 NCAA University Division football season. The Cavaliers were led by first-year head coach Don Lawrence and played their home games at Scott Stadium in Charlottesville, Virginia. They competed as members of the Atlantic Coast Conference, finishing tied for third.

Schedule

References

Virginia
Virginia Cavaliers football seasons
Virginia Cavaliers football